Mark Draper (born 1970), is an English footballer.

Mark Draper may also refer to:

Mark Draper (tennis) (born 1971), Australian tennis player
Mark Draper (runner) (born 1984), British runner and medallist at the 2011 European Cross Country Championships
Mark Draper, character in Silk (TV series)